Nurpur may refer to:

 Nurpur, Fenchuganj, a village in Sylhet, Bangladesh
 Nurpur, Comilla, a village in Comilla, Bangladesh
 Nurpur, Himachal Pradesh, a city and municipal council in the state of Himachal Pradesh, India
 Nurpur, Jalandhar, a village in Nakodar in Jalandhar district of Punjab State, India
 Nurpur, Murshidabad, a village in the state of West Bengal, India
 Nurpur, SBS Nagar, a village in Shaheed Bhagat Singh Nagar district of Punjab State, India
 Nurpur State, a princely state of India during the British Raj

See also 
 Noorpur (disambiguation)